Phania is the scientific name of two genera of organisms and may refer to:

Phania (fly), a genus of flies in the family Tachinidae
Phania (plant), a genus of plants in the family Asteraceae